Golmud Airport  is a dual-use military and civil airport serving Golmud, Qinghai province, China.

Golmud Airport ranked 138 out of China's 166 civil airports by passenger volume in 2009. In that year, it served 38,479 passengers, an 82% increase over 2008.

Airlines and destinations

See also
List of airports in China
List of highest airports

References

Airports in Qinghai
Chinese Air Force bases